Elshan Mamedov (born 4 May 1980 in Baku) is an Azerbaijani football player who currently plays for Sharurspor PFK as a forward.

Career statistics

References

External links
Player`s interview
Player`s profile

1980 births
Living people
Azerbaijani footballers
Qarabağ FK players
Simurq PIK players
FK Standard Sumgayit players
Footballers from Baku
Association football forwards
Azerbaijan international footballers